Kill Me Again is a 1989 American neo-noir thriller film.

Kill Me Again may also refer to:

Kill Me Again, a 1996 novel by Leslie Rule
Kill Me Again, a 2016 novel by Rachel Abbott
"Kill Me Again", a song by Oomph! from Wahrheit oder Pflicht
Croaker: Kill Me Again, a 1994 novel by Paul Bishop
"Widow: Kill Me Again", a comic book mini-series by Mike Wolfer